The Battle of Sanfengshan, literally the Battle of the Three-Peak Mountain, was a major decisive battle fought between the Mongol Empire and Jin China during the first stage of the Mongol conquest of the Jin dynasty. The battle was fought in 9 February 1232 at the Sanfeng Mountain which is in the southwest of what is now the city Yuzhou in Henan Province, China. The battle resulted with a crushing Mongol victory, successfully planned and orchestrated by their general Subutai, and successfully wiped out the last field army of the Jin Dynasty, therefore sealing its fate of falling to the Mongol Empire.

References

Mongol conquest of Jin China
Sanfengshan
Sanfengshan
1232 in the Mongol Empire